Charlotte Adams is a fictional character from the Australian Seven Network soap opera Home and Away, portrayed by actress Stephanie Chaves-Jacobsen. She first appeared during the episode that aired on 10 September 2001 and departed following her on-screen death on 3 September 2002.

Character development
Charlotte is described by Network Seven as "pretty, smart, generous and sincere" and has "an uncanny ability to draw people out and make them feel good about themselves". Charlotte likes to meet new people and learn about their life. Charlotte works in medicine and enrolled in medical school so she could carry out work on a professional level. She is also described "fairly bright" but "no genius" so she struggles to get through her degree. Charlotte often surprises herself when she succeeds in her work and not one to boast Charlotte just "claims she was lucky".

Producers decided to write the character out of Home and Away in 2002. Chaves-Jacobsen told Jason Herbison from Inside Soap that "it's sad but it's just something that happens."

Storylines
Charlotte is first seen as a trainee doctor at Northern Districts hospital. Her first emergency is to treat her neighbour Jude Lawson (Ben Steel) who has been seriously injured in a motorcycle crash. Flynn Saunders (Martin Dingle-Wall) is on hand to help her in surgery and they are both able to save Jude's life. Charlotte soon becomes friends with Jude's teenage brother Noah (Beau Brady) and Seb Miller (Mitch Firth) who is living with them.

Charlotte's boyfriend Dr. Steve Kent (Don Hany) lives in the city and she hardly gets to spend any time with him. When he does visit, Steve frequently suggests that Charlotte moves to the city with him and put her grandmother Gladys (Moya O'Sullivan) into a care home, which Charlotte refuses to do. Steve proposes and Charlotte accepts. On the night of the proposal, things take a horrible turn and when Noah, Jude and Hayley Smith (Bec Cartwright) return home they find a bruised Charlotte crying on the stairs. Charlotte then breaks up with Steve and later makes the agonising decision to commit Gladys to a home after she develops Alzheimer's and causes a fire.

Charlotte moves in with Sally Fletcher (Kate Ritchie). On the night of the school formal, Charlotte is called out to a car crash which involves Alex Poulos (Danny Raco), Brodie Hanson (Susie Rugg) and Miles Alcott (Steven Rooke). Charlotte and the paramedics battle to save Miles, but ultimately fail and he dies at the scene.

Following a post-HSC party, Charlotte and Jude begin dating. Charlotte later discovers she is pregnant with twins and turns to Flynn for support, much to Jude's anger as he feels that another one of his girlfriends feels more comfortable talking to Flynn. Jude then explains that his ex-girlfriend Shauna Bradley (Kylie Watson) had made a pass at Flynn several months earlier. Charlotte assures Jude she will never let him and down and he moves in with her at Sally's.

Charlotte wakes up one morning to find her morning sickness has eased and she goes into hospital to have ultrasound only to find she has miscarried and is left devastated. Rhys (Michael Beckley) and Shelley Sutherland (Paula Forrest), who had miscarried a son 15 years earlier, help Jude and Charlotte through their difficult time and arrange a memorial on the beach for the twist.

Shauna returns to Summer Bay and Charlotte worries if Jude will remain faithful. Jude later admits he still love Shauna and tells Charlotte he is leaving with her to go to Melbourne. Charlotte falls in into a depression and starts self-prescribing and develops an unhealthy attachment to a baby whose mother is having trouble. Sally and Flynn intervene before things get worse.

When her superior at Northern Districts, Dr. Carlingford (Alan Faulkner) verbally chastises her one time too many, Charlotte resigns and decides to leave Summer Bay. Prior to her departure, Charlotte learns she has inherity a large sum of money from a patient who has died in her care. Mav Patterson (Clayton Williams) convinces Charlotte to invest in a Vietnam orphanage and leave the Bay with him.

On the day of Charlotte's departure after a party at Sally's where she says a heartfelt goodbye to her friends she goes for a final swim in the ocean. However she is pulled under by a rip and is rescued by lifeguard Josh West (Daniel Collopy). During her last few seconds of consciousness, Charlotte sees a vision of Jude underwater. She is then resuscitated and hospitalised. After being admitted, Charlotte begins asking for Jude. Jude returns from Melbourne almost immediately and spends time with Charlotte who soon dies after suffering complications. Charlotte's death has an effect on several other people; Josh who blames himself for not putting up the right flags and resigns as a lifeguard, and Jade Sutherland (Kate Garven) who decides to "live for the moment". Following Charlotte's memorial service, Jude discovers she has not updated her will, leaving him as the sole beneficiary of her money. Jude decides to invest the money in the orphanage as he feels it is what Charlotte would have wanted.

Reception
For her portrayal of Charlotte, Chaves-Jacobsen was nominated for Most Popular New Female Talent at the 2002 Logie Awards.

References

External links
 Character profile at the Official AU Home and Away website

Home and Away characters
Fictional physicians
Fictional female doctors
Television characters introduced in 2001
Female characters in television